Merzifonlu Kara Mustafa Pasha ("Mustafa Pasha the Courageous of Merzifon"; 1634/1635 – 25 December 1683) was an Ottoman nobleman, military figure and Grand Vizier of Turkish origin, who was a central character in the Ottoman Empire's last attempts at expansion into both Central and Eastern Europe.

Early life and career

Kara Mustafa Pasha was of Turkish origin. However, he was brought up in the Köprülü family, of Albanian origin. He was born in the village of Mirince/Marınca near Merzifon (now called Karamustafapaşa after him), the son of a sipahi, cavalry man. His father is said to have served under Köprülü Mehmed Pasha. Possibly as a way to increase his possibilities to start an administrative career, he was introduced into the Köprülü household, where he was educated by Köprülü Mehmed Pasha, and married into the Köprülü family. How he entered the family and the details of his marriage are unclear. Within the household's inner service (enderun), he held the positions of letter-carrier (telhisci, or assistant to the grand vizier) to Köprülü Mehmed Pasha, and of silahdar (armourer). He then entered the household of the Sultan as mirahor-i-sani (master of the horse). It is said that while growing up, differently from his adoptive Köprülü brothers, he disliked alcohol, as well as Europeans and other non-Muslims. A contemporary French account says he had two children with the little Köprülü princess, who both died young, and that his wife died shortly after their death, at 31. He had four concubines (Fatma, Emine, Ayşe, Zeynep), and by them at least two sons, Yusuf and Mehmed. According to another contemporary report by Giovanni Benaglia, secretary of the Austrian ambassador in Istanbul, he divorced his "beloved Köprülü princess" after their engagement and after they had many children, and gave her to a French renegade, one of his favorites. An account by a contemporary who visited his household, Claudio Angelo di Martelli, reports of three sons who survived his death: Yusuf, Mehmed, and the youngest Ali.

He conformed to the Islamic custom of not wearing silk, and never wore silver or gold, which was a largely unenforced requirement. Europeans who met him (with few exceptions, such as Colyer, who initially described him as a man of "most agreeable nature") variously described him as greedy, humorous but terse, avid, intransigent, perfidious, covetous, unwilling to accept bribes yet concerned with improving his own well-being, and completely devoted to the Ottoman state. Later accounts by Giovanni Morosini di Alvise, Venetian bailo of Istanbul from 1675 to 1680, speak of a man "born in an obscure place of Asia, in Trebisonda, to castigate the nations," and describe him as "wholly venal, cruel and unfair." The English ambassador to Istanbul John Finch also describes him as greedy, and a "grievous oppressor of Christendom." He was particularly "unbearable to Europeans", especially for the heavy taxes he imposed (a "stream of avanias in the years 1676-1683"). Even though his adoptive siblings also imposed notable avanias, their reputation with Europeans was not as bad. Merlijn Orlon noted that his bad reputation doesn't do him justice. Orlon explains that he worked to maintain the House of Osman's supremacy in their own territories, clashing with ambitious foreign ministers. This resulted in his bad reputation. He dealt differently with the Dutchmen for political reasons, and this resulted in Colyer's more positive account of him. As the Franco-allied wars ended, a preferential treatment of the Dutch became useless, and, as a result, Mustafa's relationship with Colyer grew troubled.

In 1659 he had become a governor of Silistria and subsequently held a number of important posts. Within ten years, he was acting as deputy for his brother-in-law, the grand vizier Köprülüzade Fazıl Ahmed Pasha when absent from the Sultan's court.

He served as a commander of ground troops in a war against Poland, negotiating a settlement with John Sobieski in 1676 that added the province of Podolia to the empire. The victory enabled the Ottomans to transform the Cossack regions of the southern Ukraine into a protectorate. When his brother-in-law Köprülü Fazıl Ahmed Pasha died that same year, Mustafa succeeded him as grand vizier.

Kara Mustafa led several successful campaigns into Ukraine, attempting to shore up the position of the Cossack state of Right-Bank Ukraine, then an Ottoman vassal. He established Ottoman garrisons in many of Ukraine's cities, and conquered the traditional Cossack capital of Chyhyryn, which had been under Russian occupation.

Battle of Vienna

In 1683, he launched a campaign northward into Austria in a last effort to expand the Ottoman Empire after more than 150 years of war. By mid-July, his 100,000-man army had besieged Vienna (guarded by 10,000 Habsburg soldiers), following in the footsteps of Suleiman the Magnificent in 1529. By September, he had taken a portion of the walls and appeared to be on his way to victory.

But on 12 September 1683, a Polish army under King John III Sobieski took advantage of dissent within the Ottoman military command and poor disposition of his troops, winning the Battle of Vienna with a devastating flank attack led by Sobieski's Polish Winged Hussars. The Ottomans retreated into Hungary, much of which was subsequently conquered by the Habsburgs and their Holy League allies.

The defeat cost Mustafa his position, and ultimately, his life. On 25 December 1683, Kara Mustafa was executed in Belgrade at the order of Mehmed IV. He suffered death by strangulation with a silk cord, which was the method of capital punishment inflicted on high-ranking persons in the Ottoman Empire. His last words were, "Am I to die?" and "As God pleases."

Legacy

The Foundation of Merzifonlu Kara Mustafa Pasha was one of the largest foundations ever founded both in Ottoman Empire and Turkey. According to the official records, it was last managed by the descendants of Kara Mustafa Pasha. The last few managers of the foundation were Mustafa Pasha's descendant Ahmed Asım Bey (born 1844), his son Mehmed Nebil Bey (born 1888) (also known as Merzifonlu Karamustafaoğlu or Merzifonlu Karamustafapaşaoğlu), and his son, the Turkish painter Doğan Yılmaz Merzifonlu Karamustafaoğlu, better known as Yılmaz Merzifonlu (1928–2010), until 1976. The "Merzifonlu Karamustafaoğlu" family name ended with the marriage of Yılmaz Merzifonlu's only daughter, Abide Tuğçe Mit. Kara Mustafa Pasha's family and descendant tree can be found via Turkey's Directorate General of Foundations.

Kara Mustafa Pasha's legacy in modern Turkey is mixed. Whereas historians describe him either as a capable tactician or reckless commander, Kemal Atatürk held a sympathetic view of the man. It is said that, while attending a lecture at an Ankara institution in 1933, at which a professor spoke disparagingly of Kara Mustafa Pasha, Atatürk spoke up in favour of Kara Mustafa, arguing that marching an army of 173,000 men from Constantinople to Vienna, the "heart of Europe", was a colossal undertaking for any commander, and that the only other person who came close to such a feat was Sultan Suleiman the Magnificent himself.

Kara Mustafa's birthplace near Merzifon district was renamed Karamustafapaşa in his honour.

In media
In the 2012 Polish and Italian historical drama film September Eleven 1683 about the Battle of Vienna, Kara Mustafa Pasha is portrayed by Italian actor Enrico Lo Verso.

See also
 Köprülü era of the Ottoman Empire
 Köprülü family
 List of Ottoman Grand Viziers

References

Further reading

1630s births
1683 deaths
Köprülü family
Pashas
Turks from the Ottoman Empire
Ottoman people of the Great Turkish War
17th-century Grand Viziers of the Ottoman Empire
Executed people from the Ottoman Empire
17th-century executions by the Ottoman Empire
People executed by ligature strangulation
Kapudan Pashas
People from Merzifon